Streltsy were the units of Russian firearm infantry from the 16th to the early 18th centuries and also a social stratum, from which personnel for streltsy troops were traditionally recruited. They are also collectively known as streletskoye voysko (стрелецкое войско, riflemen army). These infantry troops reinforced feudal levy horsemen or pomestnoye voysko (поместное войско).

Origins and organization 
The first streltsy units were created by Ivan the Terrible sometime between 1545 and 1550 and armed with arquebuses. During his reign, Russia was fighting wars almost continuously, including the Livonian War  in the North and wars against the Khanates in the South. They first saw combat at the siege of Kazan in 1552. Initially, the streltsy were recruited from among the free tradespeople and from the rural population. Subsequently, military service in this unit became lifelong and hereditary. Thus, while earlier in the 16th century they had been an elite force, their effectiveness was reduced by poor training and lack of choice in recruiting.

Streltsy were subdivided into vyborniye (выборные), or selected (later – of Moscow) and gorodskiye (городские), or municipal (in different Russian cities).

 The streltsy of Moscow guarded the Kremlin, performed general guard duty, and participated in military operations. They also carried out general police and fire-brigade functions in Moscow. Grigory Kotoshikhin, a Russian diplomat who had spied for and then defected to Sweden in the 1660s, reported that they used axes and buckets and copper pumps as well as hooks to pull down adjacent buildings so that fires would not spread, but Adam Olearius, a German who travelled to Russia in the 17th century, noted that they never used water.
 The municipal streltsy performed garrison and border duty and carried out orders of the local administration.

Streltsy came under the control of the Streltsy Department (Стрелецкий приказ, or Streletsky prikaz); however, in times of war they came under their superiors. The municipal streltsy were also under the jurisdiction of the local voevodes.

The largest military administrative unit of the streltsy forces was pribor (прибор), that would later be renamed into prikaz and in 1681 – into regiment (полк, or polk). Commanders of the Streltsy unit (стрелецкие головы, or streletskiye golovy) and colonels in charge of regiments were chiefs of prikazi. They had to be nobles and appointed by the government.

The regiments (polki) were subdivided into sotni (сотни, or hundreds) and desyatki (десятки, or tens). They could be mounted (стремянные, or stremyanniye; стремя (stremya) in Russian means "stirrup") and unmounted (пешие, or peshiye; пеший (peshiy) means "foot soldier").

Uniforms and equipment 

Streltsy had identical uniforms, training and weapons. Uniforms consisted of red, blue or green coats with orange boots.  Their primary weapon was an arquebus or musket, and they carried pollaxes or bardiches, and sabres for defense; some units used pikes.  The longer weapons were also used to support the arquebus or musket while firing.

Service conditions
The Russian government was chronically short of cash and so often did not pay the streltsy well. While "entitled" to an estimated four rubles a year in the 1550s, they were often allowed to farm or trade in order to supplement their incomes. This reduced their combat effectiveness and often their desire to go on campaigns (since a season on campaign meant loss of income). Streltsy and their families lived in their own neighborhoods or districts settlements and received money and bread from the State Treasury. In certain locations, Streltsy were granted strips of land instead of money.  The Streltsy settlement in Moscow was located near where the main campus of Moscow State University now stands.

Military tactics 
Military commanders deployed the streltsy in static formations, often against set formations or fortifications.  They often fired from a platform and employed a mobile wooden "fortification" known in Russian as a "Gulyay-gorod" (literally a "walking fort").  They reportedly fired in volley or caracole fashion; the first line firing and then stepping back to reload while the second line stepped forward to fire.

Politics
At the end of the 16th century, there were 20,000-25,000 streltsy; in 1681, there were 55,000, including 22,500 in Moscow alone. Streltsy’s engagement in handicrafts and trade led to a significant proprietary inequality among them and their blending with tradesmen. Even though Streltsy demonstrated their fighting efficiency on several occasions, such as the siege of Kazan in 1552, the war with Livonia, the Polish-Swedish invasion in the early 17th century and military operations in Poland and Crimea, in the second half of the 17th century Streltsy started to display their backwardness compared to the regular soldier or reiter regiments (see Imperial Russian Army). Military service hardships, frequent salary delays, abuse on the part of local administration and commanders led to regular Streltsy's (especially the poorest ones) participation in anti-serfdom uprisings in the 17th and early 18th centuries, such as the peasant wars in the beginning of the 17th century and in 1670–1671 (leader – Stepan Razin), urban uprisings (the Moscow uprising of 1682, the Streltsy uprising of 1698, the Bulavin Rebellion of 1705–1706 in Astrakhan).

At the same time, those streltsy who had been on top of the hierarchy enjoyed their social status and, therefore, tried to hold back the regular streltsy forces and keep them on the government’s side. In the late 17th century, the streltsy of Moscow began to actively participate in a struggle for power between different government groups, supporting the Old Believers and showing hostility towards any foreign innovations.

The streltsy became something of a "praetorian element" in Muscovite politics in the late 17th century. In 1682 they attempted to prevent Peter the Great from coming to the throne in favor of his half-brother, Ivan.

Disbandment

After the fall of Sophia Alekseyevna in 1689, the government of Peter the Great engaged in a process of gradual limitation of the streltsy’s military and political influence. Eight Moscow regiments were removed from the city and transferred to Belgorod, Sevsk, and Kiev.

In spite of these measures, the streltsy revolted yet again during the Grand Embassy of Peter the Great in Europe. Although the revolt was put down by the Scottish general Patrick Gordon who had entered Russian service under Tsar Alexis in 1661 even before the Tsar's return to Russia, Peter nonetheless cut short his embassy and returned to finally crush the streltsy with savage reprisals, including public executions and torture. Tortures included roasting the bare back, tearing flesh with iron hooks, and crushing feet in wooden presses called butuks; executions included being broken on the wheel and being buried alive. Many of the bodies were hung around Novodevichy Convent where Sophia Alekseyevna and Eudoxia were confined for aiding the rebellion.

The corps was technically abolished in 1689; however, after having suffered a defeat at Narva in 1700, the government stopped their disbandment. The most efficient streltsy regiments took part in the most important military operations of the Great Northern War and in Peter’s Pruth River Campaign of 1711. Gradually, streltsy were incorporated into the regular army. At the same time the Municipal Streltsy started to be disbanded.

Liquidation of most streltsy units was finally finished in the 1720s; however, the Municipal Streltsy were kept in some cities until the late 18th century.

The Preobrazhensky Regiment and the Semyonovsky Regiment of the Imperial Guard replaced the streltsy and the traditional ryndy as the tsar's bodyguards.

See also

History of Russian military ranks
Rynda

References

Further reading

Military of the Russian Empire
Military units and formations of the Russian Empire
16th- and 17th-century warrior types